William Wallace Horstick (January 31, 1902 – May 27, 1973) was an American prelate of the Episcopal Church who served as the second Bishop of Eau Claire from 1944 till 1969.

Biography
Horstick was born in Harrisburg, Pennsylvania on January 31, 1902, the son of John Franklin Horstick and Emma Machen. He graduated with a Bachelor of Divinity from Nashotah House Theological Seminary in 1928, and received two honorary degrees from the same institution: Doctor of Divinity (1944) and Doctor of Canon Law. (1969).

In December 1928, Horstick was ordained deacon by Bishop Benjamin F. P. Ivins of Milwaukee, and priest in June 1929 by Bishop Reginald Heber Weller of Fond du Lac. He became curate at the Church of the Redeemer in Chicago, while in 1931 he became rector of Trinity Church in Aurora, Illinois. On July 28, 1937, he was married Joan E. Piersen and together had three children.

He was elected second Bishop of the Episcopal Diocese of Eau Claire on April 18, 1944, and consecrated on June 29, 1944, in Christ Church Cathedral, Eau Claire. He retired on December 31, 1969, and was succeeded by Stanley Hamilton Atkins.

References

Obituary, Nashotah Review, Fall 1973, pp. 145–146

1902 births
1973 deaths
Nashotah House alumni
20th-century American Episcopalians
Episcopal bishops of Eau Claire
20th-century American clergy